Nicetas or Niketas is a Greek given name, meaning "victorious one" (from Nike "victory").
The veneration of martyr saint Nicetas the Goth in the medieval period gave rise to the Slavic forms: Nikita, Mykyta and Mikita

People with the name Nicetas
 Nicetas of Syracuse, ( 400 – 335 BC), Greek philosopher
 Nicetas of Smyrna, late 1st-century Greek sophist and rhetorician, see Second Sophistic
 Nicetas of Remesiana, 4th-century bishop of the Dacians, now the patron saint of Romania
 Nicetas the Goth, 4th-century martyr
 Nicetas (Bishop of Aquileia), mid-5th-century archbishop of Aquileia
 Nicetas (cousin of Heraclius), early 7th-century Byzantine general
 Niketas the Persian, 7th-century Byzantine officer
 Niketas (son of Artabasdos), mid-8th-century Byzantine general
 Nicetas of Medikion (Nicetas the Confessor,  783 – 824), Byzantine monk and hegumenos
 Nicetas the Patrician (Nicetas Monomachos,  761 – 836), Byzantine eunuch official and monk, opponent of Iconoclasm
 Niketas Byzantios, ninth century, Byzantine theologian, school of Photius, wrote on Islam
 Niketas Ooryphas ( 860 – 873), Byzantine official, patrician and admiral
 Niketas (son of Ioube) ( 912), Byzantine general and governor
 Nicetas of Heraclea, 11th-century Greek catenist
 Nicetas Eugenianus, Byzantine Greek author of Drosilla and Charicles, see Jean François Boissonade de Fontarabie
 Nicetas of Novgorod ( 1095 – 1108), saint and Bishop of Novgorod
 Nicetas of Nicomedia, 12th-century archbishop
 Nicetas of Chonae, 12th-century bishop in Byzantine Anatolia
 Nicetas (Bogomil bishop) (papa Nicetas), 12th-century bishop of Constantinople
 Niketas Choniates ( 1155 – c. 1215), Byzantine historian
 Niketas Scholares ( 1341 – 1361), Byzantine Greek military leader
 Nicetas I of Constantinople ( 766 – 780), Ecumenical Patriarch of Constantinople
 Nicetas II of Constantinople ( 1186 – 1189), Ecumenical Patriarch of Constantinople
 Niketas Stethatos (Nicetas Pectoratus,  1005 – c. 1090), Byzantine mystic and theologian
 Nicetas of Naupactus, see Minuscule 886
 Nikon Nizetas, cover name of WW1 spy Alfred Redl

See also
Anicetus (disambiguation)
Nikita (disambiguation)
Victor (name)

Greek masculine given names